Titiraupenga  (also known as Mount Titiraupenga) is an extinct  high basaltic andesite stratovolcano on whose southern slopes is located the geographical centre of the North Island of New Zealand. It is in the Pureora Forest Park between Lake Taupō and Te Kuiti on the North Island Volcanic Plateau in New Zealand. The area of the mountain is in a scenic reserve that is  "recognised as one of the finest rain forests in the world".

Geography

The mountain is covered in native forest and is in the southern Waikato region.

Geology
It is to the north east of a larger stratovolcano, Mount Pureora, and both are located to the south of the extinct Mangakino caldera on a basement of Waipapa composite terrane. The basaltic andesite lavas are made up of plagioclase, clinopyroxene and orthopyroxene, with rare olivine and hornblende phenocrysts with an age of 1.89 ± 0.02 Ma.

Access
The nearest main roads are State Highway 30 and State Highway 32. There is road access to a track to the summit, which also by a fair walk onwards gives access to the summit of Mount Pureora.

See also
 List of volcanoes in New Zealand
 Pureora Forest Park

References

Volcanoes of Waikato
Mountains of Waikato
Landforms of Waikato